Gyeongju Korea Hydro & Nuclear Power WFC (Korean: 경주 한국수력원자력 여자 축구단), also known as Gyeongju KHNP Women's Football Club, is a South Korean women's football club. The club was announced in October 2016 as an expansion team of WK League. It is run by Korea Hydro & Nuclear Power and play their home games at Gyeongju Football Park.

History
In October 2016, the formation of Gyeongju KHNP Women's Football Club was announced by the president of Korea Hydro & Nuclear Power Co., Ltd and the mayor of Gyeongju.

Current squad

Backroom staff

Coaching staff
Manager:  Song Joo-hee
Head coach:  Lee Joo-seop
Coach:  Choi Joon-hyuk
Goalkeeping coach:  Park Gyu-hong
Fitness coach:  Kim Bom-bom

Source: Official website

Honours
WK League
Runners-up (4): 2018, 2020, 2021, 2022

Records

Year-by-year

See also
Gyeongju Korea Hydro & Nuclear Power FC

References

External links 
 

Women's football clubs in South Korea
Association football clubs established in 2017
WK League clubs
2017 establishments in South Korea